Island Harbourview is one of the largest private housing estates in Tai Kok Tsui, Yau Tsim Mong District, Kowloon, Hong Kong. It is one of the property projects in MTR Olympic station Phase I. Developed by MTR Corporation, Sino Land, Bank of China (Hong Kong), Kerry Properties, China Overseas Land and Investment and Capitaland Commercial Limited, it comprises nine high-rise buildings, which were completed in 1998 and 1999. The towers are numbered from one to ten, but there is no tower four due to local superstition. 

It is the first estate to be completed in the new Reclamation Area which was part of the 1997 Construction Project.

Demographics
According to the 2016 by-census, Island Harbourview had a population of 6,549. The median age was 42.6 and the majority of residents (85.9 per cent) were of Chinese ethnicity. The average household size was 2.9 people. The median monthly household income of all households (i.e. including both economically active and inactive households) was HK$90,000.

Politics
Island Harbourview is located in Olympic constituency of the Yau Tsim Mong District Council. It is currently represented by James To Kun-sun, who was elected in the 2019 elections.

Education
Island Harbourview is in Primary One Admission (POA) School Net 32. Within the school net are multiple aided schools (operated independently but funded with government money) and Tong Mei Road Government Primary School (塘尾道官立小學).

References

External links

Official website of Island Harbourview

Private housing estates in Hong Kong
Residential buildings completed in 1998
Residential buildings completed in 1999
Olympian City
Sino Group
Kerry Properties
Bank of China
MTR Corporation
1999 establishments in Hong Kong